The 2016 New Hampshire Republican presidential primary, which took place on February 9, was the second major vote of the cycle. Donald Trump was declared the winner with 35.3% of the popular vote and picked up 11 delegates, while John Kasich emerged from a pack of candidates between 10-20% to capture second place with 15.8% of the vote and picked up four delegates.

It occurred on the same day as the Democratic primary.

Chris Christie, Carly Fiorina, and Jim Gilmore dropped out of the race after poor showings in the primary.

Campaign
Politico described the 2016 Republican primary in New Hampshire as a 
"topsy-turvy" campaign that saw "an all-out assault" on "establishment" politics.

Donald Trump dominated the polling results,  with Chris Christie, John Kasich, Marco Rubio, and Jeb Bush vying to place second and emerge as the leading mainstream alternative to Trump and to Ted Cruz.  In November Chris Christie gained the endorsement of the New Hampshire Union Leader. Candidates receiving the endorsement later received a boost of on average 8 points in the polls, but the endorsed candidate only won a Republican primary in half of the elections from 1980 to 2012.  But in late January The Boston Globe and the Concord Monitor endorsed Kasich, leading Politico to dub him the winner of the "newspaper primary."

Major debates and forums
Two major televised gatherings of major candidates took place during the 2015-16 campaign, both took place at the New Hampshire Institute of Politics of Saint Anselm College in Goffstown, New Hampshire.

August 3, 2015 – Voters First Presidential Forum
The 2016 Voters First Presidential Forum was moderated by Jack Heath of WGIR radio, who asked questions of each of the participating candidates based on a random draw. Candidates each had three opportunities to speak: two rounds of questions, and a closing statement. Topics of discussion during the forum were partially selected based on the results of an online voter survey. The facilities were provided by the New Hampshire Institute of Politics and Political Library of St. Anselm College. The forum was organized in response to the top-ten invitation limitations placed by Fox News and CNN on their first televised debates (see descriptions below).

Eleven of the candidates participated: Senators Ted Cruz, Rand Paul, and Marco Rubio participated in the forum via satellite to avoid missing a vote.  Three major Republican candidates who did not participate were Donald Trump (who chose not to attend), Jim Gilmore (who missed the cutoff deadline) and Mike Huckabee (who was invited, but did not respond).  Mark Everson did not receive an invitation, albeit after a "serious look."

The Voters First forum was broadcast nationally by C-SPAN as the originating source media entity, beginning at 6:30 p.m. EDT and lasting from 7 to 9 p.m. The event was also simulcast and/or co-sponsored by television stations KCRG-TV in Iowa, New England Cable News in the northeast, WBIN-TV in New Hampshire, WLTX-TV in South Carolina, radio stations New Hampshire Public Radio, WGIR in New Hampshire, iHeartRadio on the internet (C-SPAN is also offering an online version of the broadcast), and newspapers the Cedar Rapids Gazette in Iowa, the Union Leader in New Hampshire, and the Post and Courier in Charleston South Carolina. There was a live audience, with tickets to the event awarded via a lottery.

Lesser known candidates forum at Goffstown
One of the highlights of the campaign is when the nonrecognized candidates gather together to introduce themselves to the public at this event, which first was held in 1972. Five candidates participated. They were Stephen Comley, Tim Cook, Walter Iwachiw, Andy Martin, and Joe Robinson.

February 6, 2016 – Goffstown, New Hampshire

The eighth debate was held in New Hampshire, the first state to hold primaries, was organized by ABC News and the Independent Journal Review. It was scheduled to be held in the St Anselm's College Institute of Politics. The eighth debate did not feature an undercard event. David Muir and Martha Raddatz were moderaters, along with WMUR political director Josh McElveen and Mary Katherine Ham.

To participate in the debate, a candidate must either have placed among the top 3 candidates in the popular vote of the Iowa caucus, or placed among the top 6 candidates in an average of New Hampshire or national polls recognized by ABC News. Only polls conducted no earlier than January 1 and released by February 4 were included in the averages.

On February 4, 2016, Jeb Bush, Ben Carson, Chris Christie, Ted Cruz, John Kasich, Marco Rubio, and Donald Trump were invited to the debate.  Carly Fiorina and Jim Gilmore were not invited as they did not meet the criteria.

The debate was notable for Rubio's poor performance, where he repeated the same phrase four times, including once while Christie was criticizing him for making "canned" remarks.

Candidates
Twenty-six total candidates were on the ballot in the New Hampshire primary. The following notable candidates were listed in five major polls and participated in authorized debates. U.S. Senator Lindsey Graham of South Carolina and former Governors Bobby Jindal of Louisiana and George Pataki of New York withdrew from the race, but remained on the ballot.

The following were listed in national polls and participated in at least one nationally televised debate.

The following were listed in national polls and participated in at least one nationally televised debate, but withdrew their candidacies before the New Hampshire primary.

The following candidates have not been listed in major independent polls nor participated in Republican party sanctioned debates:
Stephen B. Comley Sr., Massachusetts (31 votes)
Tim Cook, North Carolina (77 votes)
Brooks A. Cullison, Illinois (54 votes)
Matt Drozd, Pennsylvania (5 votes)
J. Daniel Dyas Sr., Alabama (14 votes)
Kevin Glenn Huey, Colorado (7 votes)
Walter N. Iwachiw, New York (9 votes)
Frank Lynch, Florida (47 votes)
Robert L. Mann, Indiana (5 votes)
Andy Martin, New Hampshire (169 votes)
Peter Messina (5 votes)
Stephen John McCarthy, Ohio (12 votes)
Chomi Prag, Wisconsin (14 votes)
Joe Robinson, Massachusetts (44 votes) 
Richard P.H. Witz, Massachusetts (105 votes)

Endorsements 

Source:

Polling

Aggregate polls

Results

Note: Delegates were awarded to candidates who got 10% or more of the vote proportionally. Of the 25 candidate/hopefuls, five candidates garnered delegates.

Results by county

Exit polls

Analysis
According to exit polls by Edison Research, Trump's landslide in New Hampshire could be attributed to strong support from non-college whites and voters holding a moderate political ideology. Trump amassed the largest margin of victory in a New Hampshire Republican primary since 2000, when John McCain upset George W. Bush. In his victory speech, Trump promised, "I am going to be the greatest jobs president that God ever created," and that he will "knock the hell out of ISIS." Trump's tough-on-terror message resonated in the state, where 65% of Republican voters supported his proposed Muslim ban.

See also
 2016 New Hampshire Democratic presidential primary
 2016 United States presidential election

References

Republican presidential primary
New Hampshire
2016
February 2016 events in the United States